Neon Mirage is an album by Stan Ridgway. It was released on August 24, 2010 through A440 Records. It has been called his most emotionally revealing and mature work to date.

Track listing 
 "Big Green Tree"
 "This Town Called Fate"
 "Desert of Dreams"
 "Halfway There"
 "Turn a Blind Eye"
 "Wandering Star"
 "Flag Up on a Pole"
 "Lenny Bruce" (Bob Dylan cover)
 "Scavenger Hunt"
 "Behind the Mask"
 "Neon Mirage"
 "Day Up in the Sun"

Personnel 
 Stan Ridgway - acoustic guitar, electric guitar, harmonica, electronics, vocals
 Joe Berardi - percussion
 Ralph Carney - woodwinds, saxophone, flute, panpipes, horns
 Amy Farris - violin, viola, cello, mandolin, vocals
 Don Heffington - percussion
 Rick King - acoustic guitar, electric guitar, electric bass, resonator guitar, slide guitar, pedal steel guitar, vocals
 Brett Simons - bass guitar
 Pietra Wexstun - keyboards, piano, organ, electronics, melodica, vocals
 Bruce Zelesnik - percussion

References 

2010 albums
Stan Ridgway albums